B. Valarmathi is an Indian politician and was a member of the 14th Tamil Nadu Legislative Assembly from Thousand Lights constituency. As a member of All India Anna Dravida Munnetra Kazhagam, she was elected from Mylapore in 1984, Alandur constituency in the 2001 and Thousand Lights in 2011 elections.
She also served as Minister in Jayalalithaa cabinet on two occasions. Backwards class and Minority welfare (2001-2006) and Social welfare (2011-2016).

The elections of 2016 resulted in her constituency being won by Ku. Ka. Selvam. She was one among the 13 incumbent ADMK ministers defeated in 2016 Tamil Nadu assembly election.

After Jayalalitha's death, she briefly aligned with Sasikala faction before returning to ADMK camp in 2018.

She was appointed as the Chairman of Tamil Nadu Textbook Association from 2017-2021, a position which had equivalent rank as Cabinet Minister.

She was one among the few leading female leaders of ADMK.

Elections contested

References 

Dravida Munnetra Kazhagam politicians
Living people
State cabinet ministers of Tamil Nadu
Politicians from Chennai
21st-century Indian women politicians
21st-century Indian politicians
Women state cabinet ministers of India
Tamil Nadu MLAs 2011–2016
Tamil Nadu MLAs 2001–2006
1957 births
Tamil Nadu MLAs 1985–1989
All India Anna Dravida Munnetra Kazhagam politicians
Women members of the Tamil Nadu Legislative Assembly